The 2011–12 Liberty Flames basketball team represented Liberty University during the 2011–12 NCAA Division I men's basketball season. The Flames, led by third year head coach Dale Layer, played their home games at the Vines Center and were members of the Big South Conference.

Previous season
The Flames finished the 2010–11 season 19–13, 13–5 in Big South play to finish in second place. They lost in the quarterfinals of the Big South tournament to High Point.

Departures

Roster

Schedule and results

|-
!colspan=12 style=|Non-conference regular season

|-
!colspan=12 style=| Big South tournament

References

Liberty Flames basketball seasons
Liberty
Liberty Fl
Liberty Fl